Tsu-Jae King Liu is an American academic and engineer who serves as the Dean and the Roy W. Carlson Professor of Engineering at the UC Berkeley College of Engineering.

Liu is an electrical engineer with extensive expertise and achievements in both academia and the semiconductor industry. At Berkeley, Liu leads a research team that explores the development of novel semiconductor devices, non-volatile memory devices, and M/NEMS technology for ultra-low power circuits. Her team is a part of the Berkeley Emerging Technologies Research Center and the NSF Center for Energy Efficient Electronics in Science. She is also a faculty member of the Kavli Energy NanoScience Institute at Berkeley and an affiliate faculty member of Berkeley's Applied Science & Technology Graduate Program and the Nanoscale Science and Engineering Graduate Group.

Early life and education 
Liu was born in Ithaca, New York to Taiwanese parents who were graduate students at Cornell University. Her father's research was in the area of earthquake prediction and, as such, she spent the majority of her childhood in the San Francisco Bay Area. As a high-school student, Liu was given a tour of the PARC campus, where her interest in computing was stimulated by a demonstration of the Xerox Alto.

Liu received a bachelor of science, a master of science, and a doctor of philosophy in electrical engineering from Stanford University in 1984, 1986, and 1994, respectively.

Career 
After graduating from Stanford, Liu joined the research staff at the Xerox Palo Alto Research Center (PARC). Her time at PARC from 1992 to 1996 was distinguished by her work on polycrystalline thin-film transistors. In August 1996, Liu joined Berkeley as a faculty member of the Electrical Engineering and Computer Science Department. Liu has contributed to many developments in the field of semiconductor devices and technology and has co-authored over 500 papers.

Liu's leading contributions span many research areas but she is perhaps best known for the development of polycrystalline silicon-germanium thin film technology for applications in integrated circuits and microsystems. Liu is also the co-inventor of the three-dimensional FinFET transistor (fin field-effect transistor) which is the design that is used in all leading microprocessor chips today. Liu was elected to the National Academy of Engineering in 2017 "for contributions to the fin field effect transistor (FinFET) and its application to nanometer complementary metal–oxide–semiconductor (CMOS) technology".

She holds over 94 patents in the area of semiconductor devices and fabrication methods, with 80 patents pending as of 2017, 37 of which had been assigned to a company she founded, Progressant Technologies, acquired by Synopsys in 2004.

In her role as dean of Berkeley's College of Engineering, Liu has been outspoken about her commitment to increase diversity and foster inclusion and respect for women and members of underrepresented minorities in engineering. Prior to assuming her role as dean, Liu had served in extensive leadership roles at Berkeley. She was the faculty director of the Marvell Nanofabrication Laboratory. From 2008 to 2012, she was associate dean for research in the College of Engineering. She served as chair of the Electrical Engineering Division from 2012 to 2014 and as chair of the Electrical Engineering and Computer Science Department from 2014 to 2016.

She was previously senior director of engineering in the Advanced Technology Group of Synopsys.

Since 2016, Liu has served as a member of the board of directors of Intel.

Research and select publications 
A full list of Liu's publications are available online. This is a list are of her most cited works:

Awards 
Liu has received numerous accolades for her research contributions: 
Elected Member, National Academy of Inventors (2018)
Elected Member, National Academy of Engineering (2017)
Fellow, Institute of Electrical and Electronics Engineers 
DARPA Significant Technical Achievement Award, for her work on FinFET (2000)
IEEE Kiyo Tomiyasu Award, for her contributions to nanoscale MOS transistors (2010)
Outstanding Research Award, Semiconductor Industry Association (2014)
Inductee, Silicon Valley Hall of Fame
Outstanding Researcher in Nanotechnology Award, Intel (2012) 
SIA University Researcher Award (2012) 
Asia Society's Game Changer West Award (2021)

She has also been recognized for her contributions to teaching and mentorship as a faculty member:
Outstanding Teaching Award, Electrical Engineering
Distinguished Faculty Mentoring Award, UC Berkeley
Aristotle Award, Semiconductor Research Corporation

References

Living people
People from New York City
Stanford University alumni
UC Berkeley College of Engineering faculty
American electrical engineers
American women engineers
1956 births
21st-century American women